Ibeyi is the self-titled debut album of Ibeyi, released in February 2015. The album is a series of reflections on love, death and family that spans countries as well as genres. The album pays tribute to the duo's deceased father, Anga Díaz, and the track Yanira immortalizes the duo’s older sister, who died several years ago.

The first single released was "Oya".

The video for their album’s second single, "River", received attention for its stark minimalism. The twin sisters, Lisa-Kainde and Naomi Diaz, appear in a closeup shot throughout, taking turns having their heads forced underwater while the other sings.

Track listing

Charts

Weekly charts

Year-end charts

References

2015 debut albums
Ibeyi albums
XL Recordings albums